Branson Famous was an American reality series that premiered on truTV on December 29, 2014 as part of the network's latest programming revamp. It was billed as the first ever "reality musical" show.

Synopsis
Branson Famous followed the Mabe Family, stars and owners of the Baldknobbers Jamboree show, the longest running show in Branson, Missouri, a city world-famous for its live entertainment shows.

The youngest of the Mabe siblings, Breanna, runs a gift shop, but wants to make her breakthrough into show business. And to add insult to injury, there's a "new sexy singer in town", Heather Gentry.  In one of the more bizarre elements, the cast & crew break out in song during their confessionals.

Meanwhile, the Baldknobbers Jamboree is struggling in regards to finance, and the Mabe Family struggles to find a permanent solution to the issue. Some in the Mabe Family believe that this "sexy singer" will add life to the show, and possibly, allow them to make more money.

Broadcast
The series debuted on TruTV in the United Kingdom and Ireland on April 9, 2015.
As of May 2015 the series was not renewed for a second season.
In May 2015, shortly after the series wasn't renewed, a petition was drawn up in effort to have the series renewed. The petition has since been discontinued. In September 2015, Brandon Mabe stated via Facebook when asked about a possible second season rumor that the family is "still looking for a network."
As of January 2016 the show is confirmed as "permanently finished".

References

External links
Branson Famous show information on truTV.com
Baldknobbers Jamboree

2010s American comedy-drama television series
2010s American musical comedy television series
2014 American television series debuts
2015 American television series endings
English-language television shows
Television series about show business
TruTV original programming